The Lee and Gordon Mill in Chickamauga, Georgia is a historic grist mill and store.  A saw mill was another line of its business.  It produced over 70,000 bushels of milled grain in 1880, when it operated about 11 hours per day, six days per week, employing several men.

It was listed on the National Register of Historic Places in 1980.

References

External links
 

Agricultural buildings and structures on the National Register of Historic Places in Georgia (U.S. state)
Buildings and structures completed in 1868
National Register of Historic Places in Walker County, Georgia
Grinding mills in Georgia (U.S. state)